Colin Nelson (born 17 November 1942) is a Canadian bobsledder. He competed in the two man and the four man events at the 1976 Winter Olympics. He also competed in the men's singles luge at the 1968 Winter Olympics.

References

1942 births
Living people
Canadian male bobsledders
Canadian male lugers
Olympic bobsledders of Canada
Olympic lugers of Canada
Bobsledders at the 1976 Winter Olympics
Lugers at the 1968 Winter Olympics
Sportspeople from Montreal